Hypsidia niphosema is a moth in the family Drepanidae. It was described by Oswald Bertram Lower in 1908. It is found in Australia.

References

Moths described in 1908
Thyatirinae